Ohio Public Interest Research Group (Ohio PIRG) is a non-profit organization that is part of the state PIRG organizations. It works on a variety of political activities. 

In the United States, Public Interest Research Groups (PIRGs) are non-profit organizations that employ grassroots organizing, direct advocacy, investigative journalism, and litigation to affect public policy.

Mission

Ohio PIRG's mission is to deliver persistent, result-oriented public interest activism that protects our environment, encourages a fair, sustainable economy, and fosters responsive, democratic government.

History

The PIRGs emerged in the early 1970s on U.S. college campuses. The PIRG model was proposed in the book Action for a Change by Ralph Nader and Donald Ross. 
Among other early accomplishments, the PIRGs were responsible for much of the Container Container Deposit Legislation in the United States, also known as "bottle bills."

Notable members and alumni

Phil Radford

Affiliate organizations
The Fund for Public Interest Research
Environment Ohio
Environment America

References

External links
U.S. Public Interest Research Group (U.S. PIRG)
The Student PIRGs
The Public Interest Network

Non-profit organizations based in Ohio
Public Interest Research Groups
Renewable energy commercialization
Environmental ethics
Consumer rights activists